Noh Dong-geon (born 4 October 1991) is a South Korean footballer who plays as goalkeeper for Suwon Samsung Bluewings.

References

External links
 

1991 births
Living people
Association football goalkeepers
South Korean footballers
Suwon Samsung Bluewings players
K League 1 players
Footballers at the 2014 Asian Games
Asian Games medalists in football
Korea University alumni
Asian Games gold medalists for South Korea
Medalists at the 2014 Asian Games